Each "article" in this category is a collection of entries about several stamp issuers, presented in alphabetical order. The entries are formulated on the micro model and so provide summary information about all known issuers.

See the :Category:Compendium of postage stamp issuers page for details of the project.

Celebes 

Refer 	Japanese Naval Control Area

Central African Empire 

Dates 	1977 – 1979
Capital 	Bangui
Currency 	100 centimes = 1 franc

Refer 	Central African Republic

Central African Republic 

Formerly Ubangi–Chari and in French Equatorial Africa.  Was known as Central African Empire from 1977 to 1979.

Dates 	1959 –
Capital 	Bangui
Currency 	100 centimes = 1 franc

Main Article
Postage stamps and postal history of the Central African Republic

Includes 	Central African Empire

See also 	French Equatorial Africa;
		Oubangui–Chari

Central China (People's Post) 

Regional issues by Chinese People's Republic.

Dates 	1949 – 1950
Currency 	100 cents = 1 dollar

Refer 	CPR Regional Issues

Central Lithuania (Polish Occupation) 

The territory was absorbed by Poland in 1922 and became part of the USSR in 1939.

Dates 	1920 – 1922
Currency 	100 fenigow = 1 mark

Refer 	Polish Post Abroad

Cephalonia and Ithaca (Italian Occupation) 

Italian occupation forces issued Greek stamps overprinted Occupazione Militare Italiana isole Cefalonia e Itaca.
These were replaced by a general issue for all the Ionian Islands.

Dates 	1941 only
Currency 	100 lepta = 1 drachma (Greek)

Refer 	Italian Occupation Issues

See also 	Ionian Islands (Italian Occupation)

Ceylon 

Dates 	1857 – 1972
Capital 	Colombo
Currency 	100 cents = 1 rupee

Main Article 

See also 	Sri Lanka

Chad 

Used stamps of French Equatorial Africa 1937 – 1959.

Dates 	1959 –
Capital 	Ndjamena
Currency 	100 centimes = 1 franc

Includes 	Chad (French Colony)

See also 	French Equatorial Africa

Chad (French Colony) 

Used stamps of French Equatorial Africa 1937 – 1959.

Dates 	1922 – 1937
Capital 	Fort Lamy
Currency 	100 centimes = 1 franc

Refer 	Chad

Chalce 

Refer 	Khalki

Chamba 

Dates 	1886 – 1948
Currency 	12 pies = 1 anna; 16 annas = 1 rupee

Refer 	Chamba in Indian Convention states

Chandernagore 

Refer 	French Indian Settlements

Channel Islands 

British territory since the Norman Conquest, having previously been part of the Duchy of Normandy.  Alderney,
Herm and Sark are in the Bailiwick of Guernsey while Jersey has separate administration.  During WWII, the
islands were occupied by Germany from 30 June 1940 to 9 May 1945.

British stamps were used 1840–1940.  These can only be distinguished by postmark.  During the occupation
period, local issues were used in Guernsey and Jersey after British stocks ran out.  British stamps were
again in use 1945–1958.  On 10 May 1948, the only general issue for the whole Channel Islands was introduced.
British Regional issues were used from 1958 till 1 October 1969 when Guernsey and Jersey began separate postal
administration and issued their own stamps.  Alderney began local issues in 1983.

The 1948 general issue commemorated the third anniversary of the liberation.  There were two values:
1d and 2½d.  The stamps were also valid throughout Britain.

Dates 	1948 only
Capital 	St Helier (Jersey); St Peter Port (Guernsey)
Currency  	12 pence = 1 shilling; 20 shillings = 1 Jersey pound/Guernsey pound

Main Article 

See also 	Alderney;
		Great Britain (Regional Issues);
		Guernsey;
		Jersey

Charkari 

Dates 	1894 – 1940
Currency 	12 pies = 1 anna; 16 annas = 1 rupee

Refer 	Indian Native States

Chile 

Dates 	1853 –
Capital 	Santiago
Currency 	(1853) 100 centavos = 1 peso
		(1960) 10 milesimos = 1 centesimo; 100 centesimos = 1 escudo
		(1975) 100 centesimos = 1 peso

Main Article Postage stamps and postal history of Chile

Includes 	Tierra del Fuego

China 

Refer 	Chinese Empire;
		Chinese Nationalist Republic (Taiwan);
		Chinese People's Republic;
		Chinese Republic;
		Shanghai;
		Taiwan

China (British Post Offices) 

The offices were in Amoy (opened 1844), Canton (1844), Foochow (1844), Ningpo (1844), Shanghai (1844),
Swatow (1861), Hankow (1872), Kiungchow (1873), Tientsin (1882) and Chefoo (1903).  All closed on
30 November 1922.  The stamps continued to be used until 1930 in Wei–Hei–Wei, a colony which was leased
to Britain from 1898 to 1 October 1930 and was then returned to China.  The stamps were Hong Kong types
overprinted CHINA.

Dates 	1917 – 1930
Currency 	100 cents = 1 dollar

Refer 	British Post Offices Abroad

China (British Railway Administration) 

The Chinese half cent stamp of 1898 was surcharged 5 cents and overprinted BRA.  The stamps were
used for collection of a late letter fee on letters posted in a mail van on British operated railways.

Dates 	1901 only
Currency 	100 cents = 1 dollar

Refer 	British Post Offices Abroad

China Expeditionary Force 

The China Expeditionary Force was an international army sent to China in 1900.  It relieved Peking and
suppressed the Boxer Rebellion.  It continued to police northern China until 1906, though a small contingent
remained after that.

Indian stamps overprinted CEF were used at various foreign post offices throughout China until
25 November 1923.

Dates 	1900 – 1923
Currency 	12 pies = 1 anna; 16 annas = 1 rupee

Refer 	Indian Overseas Forces

China (French Post Offices) 

This refers to general issues for all French and Indo-Chinese offices in China.  Various stamps of France
or Indo-China were either overprinted or inscribed CHINE.  Several offices had individual issues.
Prior to 1894, stamps of France were used.

The offices were at Shanghai (opened November 1862), Tientsin (16 March 1889), Chefoo (November 1898),
Hankow (1898), Peking (December 1900), Amoy (January 1902), Foochow (1902) and Ningpo (1902).  All closed
on 31 December 1922.

Dates 	1894 – 1922
Currency 	(1894) 100 centimes = 1 franc
		(1907) 100 cents = 1 piastre

Refer 	French Post Offices Abroad

China (German Post Offices) 

This refers to general issues for all German post offices in China.  Various stamps of Germany were either
overprinted or inscribed CHINA.  Prior to 1898, stamps of Germany were used.

The offices were at Shanghai (opened 16 August 1886), Tientsin (October 1889), Chefoo (1 June 1892), Amoy,
Canton, Foochow, Hankow, Ichang, Nanking, Peking, Swatow and Chinkiang.  The last nine were opened after
1900 but dates are unknown.  All offices closed on 17 March 1917.

Dates 	1898 – 1917
Currency 	(1898) 100 pfennige = 1 Reichsmark
		(1905) 100 cents = 1 dollar

Refer 	German Post Offices Abroad

China (Indochinese Post Offices) 

Dates 	1900 – 1922
Currency 	(1900) 100 centimes = 1 franc
		(1919) 100 cents = 1 piastre

Main Article 

Includes 	Canton (Indochinese Post Office);
		Hoi-Hao (Indochinese Post Office);
		Kouang-Tcheou;
		Mong-Tseu (Indochinese Post Office);
		Pakhoi (Indochinese Post Office);
		Tchongking (Indochinese Post Office);
		Yunnanfu (Indochinese Post Office)

China (Italian Post Offices) 

Italy had two post offices in China: at Peking (Pechino) and Tientsin.  Both used Italian stamps particular
to the office.  The offices were open from September 1917 to 31 December 1922 and were for use by diplomatic
and military personnel.

Refer 	Pechino (Italian Post Office);
		Tientsin (Italian Post Office)

China (Japanese Occupation) 

Refer 	Japanese Occupation Issues;
		Kwangtung (Japanese Occupation);
		Mengkiang (Japanese Occupation);
		Manchukuo;
		Nangking & Shanghai (Japanese Occupation);
		North China (Japanese Occupation)

China (Japanese Post Offices) 

Stamps of Japan were issued at the various offices with an overprint in Japanese characters which denoted
Japanese Agencies.  From 15 April 1876 until 31 December 1899, stamps of Japan were used without overprint.

The main office was at Shanghai (opened 15 April 1876).  Others were at Chefoo, Chingkiang, Foochow,
Hangchow, Kiukiang, Newchang (now Yingkow), Mingoo, Shansi, Soochow and Tientsin.  All offices closed in 1922.

Dates 	1900 – 1922
Currency 	10 rin = 1 sen; 100 sen = 1 yen

Refer 	Japanese Post Offices Abroad

China (Russian Post Offices) 

The Russian offices were at Peking (opened 1870), Kalgan (1870), Tientsin (1870), Urga (Mongolia, 1870),
Shanghai (1897), Chefoo (1897), Hankow (1897), Port Arthur (1899–1904) and Dairen (1899–1904).  All were
closed in 1920.

Russian stamps without overprint were used from 1870.  From 1899, Russian stamps were overprinted
with Cyrillic KHTAH (i.e., China).  All stamps were inscribed in Russian currency but the offices
accepted Chinese payment for them at the rate of 1 Chinese cent to 1 Russian kopeck.

Dates 	1899 – 1920
Currency 	(1899) 100 kopecks = 1 Russian ruble
		(1917) 100 cents = 1 dollar

Refer 	Russian Post Offices Abroad

Chinese Empire 

Dates 	1878 – 1912
Capital 	Peking (Beijing)
Currency 	(1878) 100 candarins = 1 tael
		(1897) 100 cents = 1 dollar

Includes 	Tibet (Chinese Post Offices)

See also 	Shanghai

Chinese Nationalist Republic (Taiwan) 

Stamps are inscribed REPUBLIC OF CHINA.

Dates 	1949 – 2007
Capital 	Taipei
Currency 	100 sen = 1 dollar

See also 	Taiwan

Main Article

Chinese People's Republic 

General issues were concurrent with regional issues 1949 – 1951 and then superseded them.

Dates 	1949 –
Capital 	Beijing (Peking)
Currency 	(1949) 100 cents = 1 dollar
		(1955) 100 feu = 1 yuan

See also 	CPR Regional Issues

Chinese Post Offices 

Refer 	Tibet (Chinese Post Offices)

Chinese Provinces 

Main Article 

Includes 	Kirin & Heilungkiang;
		North Eastern Provinces;
		Sinkiang;
		Szechwan;
		Yunnan

See also 	CPR Regional Issues;
		Manchukuo

Chinese Republic 

Dates 	1912 – 1949
Capital 	Peking (Beijing)
Currency 	100 cents = 1 dollar

Chios 

Refer 	Khios

Christmas Island 

Christmas Island was discovered by Captain William Mynors on Christmas Day 1643 and annexed by Britain in 1888.
It was transferred to Australia in 1958 and is now part of Northern Territory.

Dates 	1958 –
Capital 	Flying Fish Cove
Currency 	(1958) 100 cents = 1 Malaysian dollar
		(1968) 100 cents = 1 Australian dollar

Main article
Postage stamps and postal history of Christmas Island

Chungking 

Refer 	Tchongking (Indochinese Post Office)

References

Bibliography
 Stanley Gibbons Ltd, Europe and Colonies 1970, Stanley Gibbons Ltd, 1969
 Stanley Gibbons Ltd, various catalogues
 Stuart Rossiter & John Flower, The Stamp Atlas, W H Smith, 1989
 XLCR Stamp Finder and Collector's Dictionary, Thomas Cliffe Ltd, c.1960

External links
 AskPhil – Glossary of Stamp Collecting Terms
 Encyclopaedia of Postal History

Celebes